The Old Cemetery, also known as the Milk Row Cemetery, is a historic cemetery on Somerville Avenue and School Street in Somerville, Massachusetts.  Established in 1804 on land donated by Samuel Tufts, it is the city's oldest cemetery.  The cemetery was established when Somerville was still a part of Charlestown, and many Somerville residents used that city's Phipps Street Burying Ground, and later the Mount Auburn Cemetery in Cambridge instead of this one.  As a result, this cemetery remained small, and was the only one established within the city limits in the 19th century.

The cemetery was listed on the National Register of Historic Places in 1989.

Civil War monument
The American Civil War monument, erected in 1863, is reputed to be one of the first in the nation. The monument was built under the supervision of a committee of the Somerville Light Infantry, and funded by donations. The lot in the cemetery was a gift of Enoch Robinson, and the monument was manufactured by Power & Hall, manufacturers of marble goods of Boston. That firm's junior partner, Charles E. Hall, was a Somerville resident. That same firm created a Civil War monument for Hampden, Maine the following year.

See also
National Register of Historic Places listings in Somerville, Massachusetts

References

External links
 Somerville Civil War Monuments from "Massachusetts Civil War Monuments Project"

Cemeteries on the National Register of Historic Places in Massachusetts
Buildings and structures in Somerville, Massachusetts
Cemeteries in Middlesex County, Massachusetts
National Register of Historic Places in Somerville, Massachusetts